The St. Louis Women's Invitational was a golf tournament on the LPGA Tour from 1954 to 1956 and again from 1964 to 1970. It was played at Glen Echo Country Club in St. Louis, Missouri in 1954, 1964, and 1970 and at the Norwood Hills Country Club in St. Louis, Missouri from 1955 to 1956 and 1965 to 1969.

Winners
Johnny Londoff Chevrolet Tournament
1970 Shirley Englehorn

St. Louis Women's Invitational
1969 Sandra Haynie

Holiday Inn Classic
1968 Kathy Whitworth

St. Louis Women's Invitational
1967 Kathy Whitworth

Clayton Federal Invitational
1966 Kathy Whitworth

St. Louis Open
1965 Mary Mills

Squirt Ladies' Open Invitational
1964 Mickey Wright

St. Louis Open
1957-63 No tournament
1956 Fay Crocker
1955 Louise Suggs
1954 Betsy Rawls

References

Former LPGA Tour events
Golf in Missouri
Sports in St. Louis
History of women in Missouri